The West Coast Eagles are an Australian rules football team based in Perth, Western Australia. Their 2021 season was their 35th season in the Australian Football League (AFL), their eighth season under premiership coach Adam Simpson, and their second season with Luke Shuey as captain. Having finished in the top eight every season since 2015, it was expected that West Coast would do the same in 2021.

The COVID-19 pandemic continued to have an impact on the season, with crowd restrictions at some matches and some changes to the fixture during the season. Jack Darling, who kicked 42 goals, was the club's leading goal-scorer for the fourth time in his career. Nic Naitanui was the only Eagle to be in the All-Australian squad. Nic Naitanui was West Coast's best and fairest player, winning the John Worsfold Medal. 2021 was the second year for West Coast in the AFL Women's competition, in which they finished twelfth. It was also the second year in which West Coast fielded a team in the Western Australian Football League, after having withdrawn in 2020.

Background

The West Coast Eagles are an Australian rules football team based in Perth, Western Australia, that competes in the Australian Football League (AFL). They ended the 2020 home-and-away season fifth on the ladder. Their season ended after  beat them in the first week of the finals.

In the off season, Luke Shuey was named captain of the West Coast Eagles for the second year in a row. Jeremy McGovern was named the sole vice-captain, having been in the role alongside Josh Kennedy in 2020. Kennedy and Nic Naitanui rounded out 2021's reduced leadership group as deputy vice-captains. Adam Simpson was head coach for an eighth season. There was a shake-up in assistant coaching roles following several assistant coaches leaving. The assistant coaches were Luke Webster (forwards), Adrian Hickmott (midfield) and Jaymie Graham (backs). The head of development was Gavin Bell, and the other development coaches were Mark Nicoski, Kyal Horsley and Daniel Pratt. Pratt was also the AFL Women's coach and WAFL coach.

West Coast continued with fast food outlet Hungry Jack's and online mortgage broker Lendi as their major sponsors for 2021. Their new clothing manufacturer was British sportswear company Castore, who signed a three-year contract with West Coast. The club had 106,422 members in 2021, narrowly beating  to have the most out of any AFL club for the second year in a row.

Playing list

Changes
At the end of their 2020 season, West Coast delisted Hamish Brayshaw, Nic Reid, Francis Watson, Anthony Treacy and Mitch O'Neill. Lewis Jetta was delisted after the trade period after having only played 6 AFL matches in 2020. Daniel Venables was delisted after spending the previous season and a half unable to play due to concussion, however he would later be selected by West Coast in the rookie draft.

In their second trade, Tom Hickey was traded to  after he requested to do so in order to be closer to his Queensland family and be selected for more games. Hickey only played 3 matches for West Coast in 2020, due to Nic Naitanui's good form and injury free season. The Eagles gave Brisbane pick 58 and a future third round pick, and received pick 86.

In the 2020 AFL draft, Luke Edwards (pick 52), from South Australia, and Isiah Winder (pick 57), from Western Australia were drafted. Harry Edwards was elevated from the rookie list, signing on until 2022, and Mark Hutchings was moved from the senior list to the rookie list. Zane Trew (pick 12) and Daniel Venables (pick 27) were drafted in the 2021 rookie draft.

Prior to the 2021 mid-season draft, West Coast put Daniel Venables and Jarrod Cameron on the inactive list, allowing them to select two players in the mid-season draft. Venables was put on the inactive list due to still being unable to play due to a concussion he suffered in round nine of 2019, and Cameron because of a season-ending ankle injury he received in the Eagle's WAFL team. At the mid-season draft, West Coast selected Will Collins (pick 11) and Connor West (pick 23).

Statistics

Season summary
The fixture for the 2021 season was revealed in December 2020, with each team scheduled to play 22 matches and have a mid-season bye, as was normal prior to the COVID-19 pandemic. Only the first six rounds had times and dates set for the matches, with the remaining dates released as the season progressed.

Rounds 1–12
West Coast's first match of the season was against  on a  day at Optus Stadium. The Eagles beat the Suns by 25 points, although for the first three quarters, the two teams were neck and neck. Oscar Allen kicked a career-best 4 goals. In round 2, West Coast played  at Marvel Stadium. After the Eagles were ahead by 14 points at three quarter time, the Bulldogs came from behind to win by seven points. West Coast's slow and steady kick-mark style of gameplay contrasted with the Bulldog's high speed, handball heavy style. The game was described by AFL Media and ABC News as the best so far in the season. The following round, on Easter Saturday, West Coast comfortably beat  at home. The first half of the match saw the Eagles kick ten goals to Port Adelaide's two. The second half was much more even. Port Adelaide were unable to make a comeback, but were able to stop West Coast gaining a large amount of percentage on the ladder. The game finished with West Coast on 108 points and Port Adelaide on 71 points. Liam Ryan took one of his greatest marks off the back of Darcy Byrne-Jones. Max Laughton of Fox Sports described it as "one of the all-time great speckies". The win was marred by Luke Shuey injuring his hamstring, the match being his first one back after a pre-season hamstring injury. During the week after, Shuey had surgery on his hamstring tendon. West Coast stated that he would not be in any matches until at least after the Round 13 bye.

In round 4, West Coast faced  at Marvel Stadium. With the Saints coming off a thrashing in round 3, West Coast were the favourites to win. The Eagles looked like winning for most of the game, leading by up to 33 points during the third quarter, however, St Kilda made a comeback, kicking the final eight goals of the match, handing West Coast a 20 point loss. A calf injury to Shannon Hurn enabled debutant Isiah Winder to come onto the ground as a medical substitute, who scored a goal with his first kick. During the following week, Liam Ryan suffered a bone stress injury on his knee, ruling him out of playing for an expected eight weeks, and Jack Petruccelle suffered a hamstring injury, ruling him out for two weeks. The following round, West Coast played  at Optus Stadium. The Eagles won the match with 103 points to Collingwood's 76 points. Jack Darling and Oscar Allen kicked five goals each. Alex Witherden also played well on his West Coast debut, with 30 disposals and six rebound 50s. Collingwood's Mark Keane was suspended for one week due to tripping Josh Kennedy. Kennedy missed the following match as a result, with Adam Simpson describing him as "a bit sore". West Coast's round 6 match was against  at GMHBA Stadium, a ground the Eagles have not won at since 2006. West Coast were thrashed by 97 points. The Eagles scored three goals to Geelong's two in the first quarter, but after quarter time, Geelong dominated. To make matters worse for West Coast, Jeremy McGovern received a groin injury. The loss was their largest loss with Adam Simpson as coach, and largest loss since 2009.

Going into round 7, West Coast were the most injury hit team in the AFL. The players on the injury list had a total of 1,191 games of experience. Among those injured were Tom Barrass, Shannon Hurn, Jeremy McGovern, Liam Ryan, Luke Shuey and Elliot Yeo. In round 7, West Coast played  in a highly anticipated Western Derby. With the Eagles sitting tenth on the ladder after a brutal loss, and the Dockers sitting at eighth on the ladder and a full win ahead of West Coast, it was looking like Fremantle's best chance since 2015 to break their 10 derby losing streak. However, after a close opening half, West Coast ran away with the win, with the final score being 132 to 73. The goalkicking accuracy of both teams was commended, Dermott Brereton saying "This is like a showpiece game" while commentating. Tim Kelly won the Glendinning–Allan Medal after having a career-high 42 disposals and game-high 14 clearances. The following round, West Coast got their first win outside their state, beating  by 38 points at the Melbourne Cricket Ground. Unusually, neither team scored a goal in the first quarter. Brendon Ah Chee scored four goals in what was his first game in 2021. Then in round 9, West Coast beat  106 to 76 at Optus Stadium. Jack Darling's second quarter was a standout, kicking five goals, including a nutmeg between Brodie Smith's legs. The game was the first game back from injury for Tom Barrass and Jeremy McGovern.

Liam Ryan made an earlier than expected return from injury in round 10 against . The Giants gave West Coast yet another interstate loss, their fourth out of five interstate games at the time. The first three quarters saw twelve lead changes, with neither team being able to create a margin larger than two goals until the last quarter, where the Giants were able to get the final margin to 16 points. The Eagles had 31 less tackles than the Giants, and were criticised as looking disinterested throughout the match. Round 10 was Shannon Hurn's 291st match for West Coast, surpassing Dean Cox as having played the most matches for West Coast. The following round, Elliot Yeo was a surprise inclusion, being picked to play against  after having been out with osteitis pubis for the previous nine months. Yeo had played for the Eagles' WAFL team the previous week as a way of gradually getting him back playing, however he was not expected to be playing in the AFL until after the bye round. During round 11, Essendon gave West Coast their first loss at home. The Eagles gave away a 29 point margin in the second quarter to end up with a 16 point loss. West Coast also sustained several injuries during the loss. Tim Kelly received a groin injury and Oscar Allen received a concussion and neck injury. Kelly and Allen were omitted from the team for round 12, along with Josh Kennedy, Alex Witherden, Jarrod Brander and Brendon Ah Chee, who were all injured. The odds looked to be against West Coast for their match against  in round 12, but the Eagles were able to get their first win at the Sydney Cricket Ground since 1999, beating Carlton by 22 points. Liam Ryan stood out, garnering 17 touches and four goals, and Luke Edwards was solid on debut.

Rounds 13–23
West Coast had a comeback win against  in round 13 at Optus Stadium. The Tigers, who were the reigning premiers, and had an equal number of wins to West Coast at the time, lead by 22 points in the middle of the final quarter, however the Eagles kicked the final four goals. Josh Kennedy kicked the final goal with just 36 seconds to go, giving West Coast a four point lead. Two intercept marks by Shannon Hurn in the final two minutes of the game prevented Richmond from kicking the winning goal. The win gave West Coast an 8 point gap on the ladder from the teams outside the top eight. West Coast then had a bye in round 14. After they bye, they faced  at Optus Stadium. The Bulldogs thrashed the Eagles by 55 points, in what was West Coast's greatest ever loss and lowest score at Optus Stadium. At half time, West Coast's score was 16 points, having kicked just one goal in each quarter. The Bulldogs had 36 points, after inaccurate kicking caused them to have 12 behinds and 4 goals. The third quarter was evenly matched, with the Eagles kicking 20 points and the Bulldogs kicking 21. The Western Bulldogs ran away with the win in the fourth quarter though, kicking 41 points compared to the Eagle's 7.

West Coast suffered an even worse defeat against  in round 16 at GMHBA Stadium, losing 26–118. This was West Coast's lowest score since round 23, 1992, and their third lowest ever. This was West Coast's second game at GMHBA Stadium in 2021, after their 97 point defeat at the hands of Geelong, and their eighth straight defeat at that ground, with an average margin 68 points. Fox Footy commentator David King said "we might be seeing the end of an era here. We might just be seeing the West Coast campaign of four of five years tip over the edge." Dom Sheed had a game-high 37 possessions, earning him 1 Brownlow Medal vote, despite the large loss. The Eagles then received their third loss in a row, against the last-on-the-ladder .

Results

Ladder

Impact of COVID-19
At the start of the season, stadiums in Western Australia were restricted to 75% capacity due to restrictions brought about by to the COVID-19 pandemic. Optus Stadium's capacity under these restrictions was 45,000 spectators. From 11 April onwards, capacity limits were removed, enabling crowds of 60,000 to attend Optus Stadium.

On 29 April, the Thursday before the first Western Derby, Western Australian premier Mark McGowan announced that sporting venues in the state would be at 75% capacity from 1 May to 7 May, and that crowds would be required to wear masks. This came after a three day lockdown on the previous weekend for Perth and Peel due to a COVID-19 positive man being out in public for four days. Crowds were not permitted at sporting events since the lockdown started, but West Coast did not have any matches in Perth during that time. On 2 May, the day of the first Western Derby, McGowan announced that crowds were not allowed at sporting events in the state due to a separate incident where a hotel quarantine security guard and two of his close contacts tested positive to COVID-19. As a result, one of the state's most important sporting events had no crowd. On 15 April, capacity limits were removed again.

West Coast's round 12 match against , which was originally going to be at the Melbourne Cricket Ground (MCG), was moved to the Sydney Cricket Ground in response to Victoria's fourth COVID-19 lockdown. Due to that lockdown,  played their round 12 match against  at Optus Stadium instead of the MCG. Richmond then travelled to Sydney before coming back to Perth for round 13, avoiding going to Victoria. West Coast's round 14 match against Richmond was moved forward to the Sunday of round 13. No other fixtures had to be changed because both West Coast and Richmond were scheduled to have a bye in round 13.

At 11:00 am on the day of West Coast's round 15 match against the Western Bulldogs, just hours before the match went ahead, the Government of Western Australia banned crowds at large sporting events after a positive COVID-19 in Perth. This resulted in a crowd of 0 for the second time this season for West Coast.

Due to New South Wales's June COVID-19 outbreak, the Sydney Swans were relocated to Victoria. West Coast played their round 16 match against Sydney at GMHBA Stadium instead of the Sydney Cricket Ground as previously scheduled.

Awards

Liam Ryan was nominated for Mark of the Year for his round 3 mark off the back of 's Darcy Byrne-Jones and in round 12 against . Nic Naitanui was the only Eagle to be selected in the 40-man initial All-Australian squad. Oscar Allen was the only Eagle to be selected in the 22 Under 22 team, announced on 26 August. The 22 Under 22 team is an honorary team created by the AFL Players' Association to recognise the 22 best players at or under 22 years old.

West Coast held their awards night on 15 September. Nic Naitanui won the John Worsfold Medal for best and fairest player. This made him the fourth West Coast player to win the award twice in a row, following Glen Jakovich, Ben Cousins and Elliot Yeo. He won it with 200 points, ahead of Dom Sheed (160), Andrew Gaff (149), Jack Redden (137) and Jack Darling (136). Points are given after each match, where four members of the match committee give each player 0 to 3 points. Other awards presented on the night were the Chris Mainwaring Medal for Best Clubman, awarded to Liam Duggan; Emerging Talent, awarded to Harry Edwards; Leading Goalkicker, awarded to Jack Darling, who had 42 goals; WAFL Eagles Best and Fairest, awarded to Kieren Hug; and the Eagles in the Community Award, given to Josh Kennedy and Jessy Edmunds (staff).

WAFL team

West Coast's WAFL team was captained by Hamish Brayshaw. At the end of the season, they had four wins and fourteen losses, placing them last on the ladder.

See also
 2021 West Coast Eagles women's season

References

West Coast Eagles seasons
2021 Australian Football League season